The Battle of Placito or Battle of the Placito was an engagement between ethnic Mexican settlers, Confederate soldiers and Apache warriors. It took place at the village of Placitas (present-day Lincoln) in Confederate Arizona. The action is a part of the Apache Wars of the mid to late nineteenth century.

Background
Following the Gallinas massacre, Lieutenant John Pulliam of the Confederate garrison at Fort Stanton returned from his patrol in the Gallinas Mountains where he had searched for the three dead soldiers, massacred a week earlier. He arrived at Fort Stanton on September 8, 1861. That same evening, a dispatch arrived from the Placito, a Spanish-era settlement occupied by Mexican settlers. The dispatch detailed a current Apache assault on the town, ten miles below the fort. Pulliam was ordered to proceed to the village with fifteen men to help protect its citizens.

Battle 
Pulliam and his 15 men arrived at Placito that night.  The Confederates and an unknown number of Mexican men drove the Apaches out of town and then fought off the Apaches all night at a further range. Eventually, the natives gave up and retreated back into the surrounding desert. Casualties are unknown, except for the Apaches who suffered at least five men killed by Pulliam's squad. An unknown number of Apache wounded escaped the fighting. Pulliam and his men arrived back at Fort Stanton the following afternoon.

See also
New Mexico campaign

References
 Thompson, Jerry Don, Colonel John Robert Baylor: Texas Indian Fighter and Confederate Soldier. Hillsboro, Texas: Hill Junior College Press, 1971.
 Katheder, Thomas, The Baylors of Newmarket: The Decline and Fall of a Virginia Planter Family. New York and Bloomington, Ind., 2009.

External links
Friends of Fort Stanton historical page
Fort Stanton, Lincoln County New Mexico
American Southwest, a National Park Service Discover Our Shared Heritage Travel Itinerary
AERC.org: Fort Stanton Cave (slideshow)

1861 in the United States
Confederate occupation of New Mexico
Battles of the Trans-Mississippi Theater of the American Civil War
Confederate victories of the American Civil War
History of Lincoln County, New Mexico
Battles of the American Civil War in New Mexico
Battles involving the Apache
Native American history of New Mexico
Apache Wars
September 1861 events